John Ellis Roosevelt (February 25, 1853 – March 9, 1939) was a lawyer with the Wall Street firm of Roosevelt & Kobbe, the president of the Elkhorn Valley Coal Land Company and secretary of the Broadway Improvement Company. He owned the John Ellis Roosevelt Estate.

Early life
John Ellis Roosevelt was born on February 25, 1853, in New York City. He was the second child of Robert Barnhill Roosevelt and Elizabeth Ellis. Roosevelt had an older sister, Margaret Barnhill Roosevelt, and a younger brother, Robert Barnhill Roosevelt Jr. They were the first cousins of President Theodore Roosevelt through their shared paternal grandfather, Cornelius Van Schaack Roosevelt.

He also had three half siblings; Kenyon Fortescue, Granville Roland Fortescue, and Maude Fortescue. They were the children of Robert Barnhill Roosevelt and his second wife, Marion Fortescue, also known as Marion O'Shea Roosevelt.

Career
Roosevelt was a lawyer and the president of the Elkhorn Valley Coal Land Company and secretary of the Broadway Improvement Company.

He was a partner in the Wall Street law firm of Roosevelt & Kobbe, along with George C. Kobbé, at 44 Wall Street.  His half brother, Kenyon Fortescue was also a lawyer at the same firm.

The firm represented John Ellis Roosevelt's father, Robert Barnwell Roosevelt, in the lawsuit Robert B. Roosevelt v. Elbert A. Brinckerhoff, 143 F. 478 (2nd Cir. 1906).  Brinckerhoff alleged that Robert Barnwell Roosevelt had committed malpractice by permitting a mortgage on a valuable piece of Manhattan real estate at 33 Nassau Street to be cancelled. Damages were assessed against Robert Barnwell Roosevelt in excess of $100,000.  Robert Barnwell Roosevelt died four months after the decision was entered.

Personal life
On February 19, 1879, he married Nannie Mitchell Vance (1860–1912), the daughter of Samuel B. H. Vance (1814–1890), at the recently built St. Nicholas Collegiate Reformed Protestant Dutch Church, Fifth Avenue and 48th Street, in New York City in Manhattan.  Before her death of typhoid in 1912, they had three daughters:

 Anita Blanche "Pansy" Roosevelt (1882–1929), who was "ill from nervous prostration in a sanitarium in New York" in 1903.
 Gladys Roosevelt (1889–1926), who married Fairman Rogers Dick (1885–1976), son of Evans Rogers Dick in 1913. Fairman's sister, Isabelle Mildred Dick (1884–1972) was married to Stuyvesant Fish, Jr. (1883–1952), and stood up in their wedding. Gladys was killed in a horse riding accident at the Meadow Brook Hunt Club in 1926.
 Jean Schermerhorn Roosevelt (1891–1984), who married Philip James Roosevelt (1892–1941), a cousin and the son of Emlen Roosevelt, in 1925.

His wife died on September 26, 1912, of typhoid.

On January 6, 1914, he married Edith (née Hammersley) Biscoe (1884-1943), the former wife of Lt. H. E. Biscoe. Edith's sister, Lillie O. Hammersley was married to John's brother, Robert.  In 1915, Roosevelt tried to have the marriage annulled, claiming he was the victim of misrepresentation. The case was heavily reported in the News at the time.  Edith won the case in 1916 and Roosevelt was ordered to pay her $400 a month in alimony.

John E. Roosevelt was a founder of The Sayville Yacht Club and served as its inaugural Commodore from 1901 to 1907. His former summer estate, Meadow Croft is now a county park in Suffolk County, NY {https://www.suffolkcountyny.gov/Departments/Parks/Historic-Sites/Meadow-Croft}.

Roosevelt died on March 9, 1939, in Delray Beach, Florida.

References

1853 births
1939 deaths
American people of Dutch descent
John Ellis
Schuyler family
Lawyers from New York City
New York (state) lawyers